In enzymology, a ribose-5-phosphate adenylyltransferase is an enzyme that catalyzes the chemical reaction

ADP + D-ribose 5-phosphate  phosphate + ADP-ribose

Thus, the two substrates of this enzyme are ADP and D-ribose 5-phosphate, whereas its two products are phosphate and ADP-ribose.

This enzyme belongs to the family of transferases, specifically ones transferring phosphorus-containing nucleotide groups (nucleotidyltransferases).  The systematic name of this enzyme class is ADP:D-ribose-5-phosphate adenylyltransferase. Other names in common use include ADP ribose phosphorylase, and adenosine diphosphoribose phosphorylase.

References

 
 

EC 2.7.7
Enzymes of unknown structure